Clark Brisson (born February 9, 1969) is a retired U.S. soccer striker who is currently the Executive Director of the James Island Youth Soccer Club. He was a 1989 first team All American at the University of South Carolina and went on to play for nearly a decade in the National Professional Soccer League, USISL and USL A-League.

Youth
Brisson attended Sanderson High School in Raleigh, North Carolina, graduating in 1987. In . Sanderson defeated Reynolds High School of Winston-Salem in the State 4A championship.  He then attended the University of South Carolina, playing on the men’s soccer team from 1987 to 1990. He finished his career ranked sixth all time on the school’s career goals list with 36 and fifth all time on the assists list with 26.  In 1989, he was selected as a first team All American.  In 1991, he played on the U.S. soccer team at the World University Games.

Professional
On October 15, 1991, Brisson signed with the Canton Invaders of the |National Professional Soccer League who had selected him in the second round of the 1991 NPSL draft. He was the team's second leading scorer, but left the team at the end of the 1991-1992 season.  In 1993, Brisson was the first player signed by the expansion Charleston Battery of the USISL. In October 1993, he moved to the Baltimore Spirit of the NPSL for the 1993-1994 season.  He then moved to the Dayton Dynamo for the 1994-1995 season.  In 1996, he signed with the Philadelphia KiXX for the 1996-1997 season. In 1999, Brisson was back with the Battery, this time playing in the USL A-League.

Coach
At some point in his career, Brisson served as an assistant coach with the University of New Haven women’s soccer team. However, he has spent most of his coaching career with youth clubs in South Carolina. From 2000 to 2003, he was the director of City Soccer in Charleston. He also served as the Director of Coaching in the Summerville Soccer Club until 2007. That year, he founded Bridge Futbal Alliance, which eventually evolved into the South Carolina United Battery Academy under the direction of the Battery professional club.

References

External links
 Charleston Battery Stats

1969 births
Living people
All-American men's college soccer players
American soccer players
Baltimore Spirit players
Canton Invaders players
Charleston Battery players
Dayton Dynamo players
National Professional Soccer League (1984–2001) players
Philadelphia KiXX players
South Carolina Gamecocks men's soccer players
University of New Haven people
USISL players
A-League (1995–2004) players
Soccer players from North Carolina
Jesse O. Sanderson High School alumni
Association football forwards